The 2012 ITM Hamilton 400 was a motor race for the Australian sedan-based V8 Supercars. It was the third event of the 2012 International V8 Supercars Championship. It was held on the weekend of 20–22 April at the Hamilton Street Circuit, in Hamilton, New Zealand.

The event was dominated by the Ford Performance Racing team with Will Davison winning the Saturday race and Mark Winterbottom winning the Sunday race. Davison was the best performed driver over the whole weekend.

Report

Race 5

Qualifying

Race

Race 6

Qualifying

Race

Standings
 After 6 of 30 races.

References

ITM
ITM
Hamilton 400
April 2012 sports events in New Zealand